Nicolas Napol (born 3 April 1996) is a French former footballer who is last known to have played as an attacker for Croix.

Career

In 2014, Napol signed for Atalanta in the Italian Serie A from the reserves of French Ligue 1 side Lorient, despite initially feeling apprehensive.

In 2015, he was sent on loan to Avellino in the Italian second division.

Before the second half of 2016/17, he signed for French fifth division club UJA Maccabi Paris.

In 2017, Napol signed for Croix in the French fourth division.

References

External links
 

French footballers
French people of Belgian descent
Expatriate footballers in Italy
Serie B players
1996 births
Living people
French expatriate footballers
Association football forwards
French expatriate sportspeople in Italy
U.S. Avellino 1912 players
Championnat National 2 players
Championnat National 3 players
UJA Maccabi Paris Métropole players
Iris Club de Croix players